USS Foss (DE-59) was a  of the United States Navy, in service from 1943 to 1957. She was sunk as a target in September 1966.

Namesake
Rodney Shelton Foss was born on 8 May 1919 in Monticello, Arkansas to George and Linnie Shelton Foss. The family moved to Pine Bluff, Arkansas, where he graduated from Pine Bluff High School.  He attended the University of Arkansas and Louisiana State University before entering the military.

He enlisted in the U.S. Navy on 5 September 1940 and received training at Northwestern University in Chicago and was commissioned as an Ensign. Foss was stationed to Naval Air Station Kaneohe Bay, Hawaii, assigned to Patrol Squadron 11 (VP-11). Foss was the graveyard shift duty officer when the Japanese attacked Pearl Harbor at 07:52 on 7 December 1941. Foss was due to be relieved just as Japanese aircraft began strafing the flight line occupied by VP-11 and VP-12 and the two rows of the squadrons' PBY Catalina aircraft lined up neatly along the ramp area between the hangar and the sea wall. Because they approached from the north, the Japanese arrived at NAS Kaneohe several minutes before the rest of the attack force reached Pearl Harbor, making the shots fired at Kaneohe the first fired in the attack. Foss was struck and killed instantly by a 20mm cannon shell during the first strafing run, making him one of the first U.S. casualties in the Pacific War. He was interred in Oakland Cemetery. He was posthumously awarded a Commendation, a Pacific Fleet medal, and a Purple Heart.

History
Foss was launched on 10 April 1943 by Bethlehem-Hingham Shipyard, Hingham, Massachusetts; sponsored by Mrs. George R. Foss, mother of Ensign Foss; and commissioned on 23 July 1943.

1943–1950
Foss sailed from Boston on 22 September 1943 for the Netherlands West Indies to escort a tanker convoy back to New York.  From New York, she put to sea once more on 13 October, again with a group of tankers and, after calling at Aruba, crossed the Atlantic to Dakar, Oran and Algiers, returning by way of Aruba and the Canal Zone to New York. Between 26 December and 9 October 1944, Foss operated on the New York-Derry convoy route, making seven voyages to build up forces in Europe for the Normandy invasion and to support the advance on the continent once the landings had been made.

Assigned to operational development activities in anti-submarine warfare, Foss sailed out of Washington, New London, Charleston, Norfolk, and ports in Florida during the next six years.  She tested equipment for the Naval Research Laboratory and conducted operations under the direction of the Fleet Sonar School, the Anti-submarine Development Detachment, and the Operational Development Force.  In 1946, she was equipped with ship/shore power conversion equipment, with which, during the winter of 1947–48, she provided Portland, Maine, with emergency electric power after normal power resources had failed because of forest fires and lack of rain. In August 1950, Foss took part in rocket experiments at Cape Canaveral, recording data after seaward firings.

1950–1957
Reassigned to the Pacific Fleet, Foss departed Norfolk on 29 September 1950, reaching San Diego on 11 October.  Six days later, she sailed for duty in Korea, where her special ability to provide power to the shore was used at Chinnampo, Inchon, and Hŭngnam in November and December. She arrived at Ulsan Man on 25 December and remained until 18 August 1951, providing power for an Army unit stationed there.

Returning to San Diego on 10 September, Foss served in ordnance tests until 21 September, when she raised Pearl Harbor, her new home port.  During the next five years, she operated locally in the Hawaiian Islands, as well as making two cruises on surveillance patrol through the islands of the Pacific Trust Territory and two tours of duty in the Far East.  During her 1955 tour, she served as station ship at Hong Kong.

Decommissioning and fate
In June 1957, Foss returned to the west coast and was decommissioned and placed in reserve at Mare Island Naval Shipyard on 30 October 1957.

Awards
Foss received one battle star for Korean War service.

References

External links 

 

 

Buckley-class destroyer escorts
World War II frigates and destroyer escorts of the United States
Cold War frigates and destroyer escorts of the United States
Korean War frigates and destroyer escorts of the United States
Ships built in Hingham, Massachusetts
1943 ships